The knockout stage for the 2020 Uber Cup in Aarhus, Denmark, began on 14 October 2021 with the quarter-finals and ended on 16 October with the final tie.

Qualified teams
The top two placed teams from each of the eight groups qualified for this stage.

Bracket
The draw was conducted on 13 October 2021, after the last match of the group stage.

Quarter-finals

Quarter-final 1

Quarter-final 2

Quarter-final 3

Quarter-final 4

Semi-finals

Semi-final 1

Semi-final 2

Final

References

Uber knockout stage